Senator Finch may refer to:

Bill Finch (politician) (born 1956), Connecticut State Senate
Edward C. Finch (1862–1933), Washington State Senate
Silas Finch (fl. 1830s), Michigan State Senate